Amnirana amnicola is a species of frog in the family Ranidae.
It is found in Cameroon, Equatorial Guinea, Gabon, and possibly Republic of the Congo.
Its natural habitats are subtropical or tropical moist lowland forests and rivers.
It is threatened by habitat loss.

References

amnicola
Taxonomy articles created by Polbot
Amphibians described in 1977